Nandivelugu is an area of Tenali city in Guntur district of the Indian state of Andhra Pradesh. It is located in Tenali mandal of Tenali revenue division. The Village became part of the Tenali city in 2011. It is immediate area after Autonagar, Tenali.

Geography 

Demographics 

 census, Nandivelugu had a population of 6,880. The total population constitutes 3,404 males and 3,476 females —a sex ratio of 1021 females per 1000 males. 620 children are in the age group of 0–6 years, of which 321 are boys and 299 are girls. The average literacy rate stands at 75.18% with 4,706 literates.

Government and politics 

Nandivelugu gram panchayat is the local self-government of the village. It is divided into wards and each ward is represented by an elected ward member. The ward members are headed by a Sarpanch. It forms a part of Andhra Pradesh Capital Region.

Transport 

Guntur-Nandivelugu Road connects the village with the district headquarters, Guntur and the Tenali–Mangalagiri Road connects it with the urban centers of Tenali and Mangalagiri.

Education 
The primary and secondary school education is imparted by government, aided and private schools, under the School Education Department of the state. The total number of students enrolled in primary, upper primary and high schools in the village are 559.

Zilla Parishad High School is a Zilla Parishad funded school, which provides secondary education in the village.

See also 
 Villages in Tenali mandal

References 

Villages in Guntur district